= South Mahé =

Region of Seychelles

South Mahé is a region of Seychelles.
